Parrish & Heimbecker Limited is a Canadian grain company with about 1,500 employees across Canada and the northern United States. The company has several divisions including flour milling, feed milling, grain marketing, transportation and logistics.

It is a private, family-owned business founded in 1909. This Canadian-owned, vertically integrated business is one of the largest full-service grain-handling and crop-input supply companies in Canada. It is the largest Canadian-owned milling company in Canada, with animal nutrition, poultry farming and food-processing divisions in Western and Eastern Canada.

In 2002, the company acquired a grain elevator at Dutton Siding, Manitoba from Agricore United. The elevator is located between Gilbert Plains and Grandview.

History
Parrish and Heimbecker was begun in 1909 by William Parrish and Norman G. Heimbecker. Until 1918, the firm bought and sold grain on the Winnipeg Grain Exchange, but did not operate grain elevators.

In 1918, P&H bought ten elevators from Louis Strong and Frederick Dowler, who were Calgary grain brokers. After buying more elevators, by 1920, P&H had 20 elevators.

Network of Canadian grain elevators and terminals
In 2011, P&H had approximately 32 grain elevators in Canada including twelve grain elevators in Ontario that handle a variety of Canadian agricultural products such as wheat, corn, barley, soybeans, oats, distillers grains, IP soybeans and navy beans.

Ships
In the 1980s P&H bought out thr bankrupt Soo River Company. They maintained a fleet of ships until they were sold to Canada Steamship Lines. P&H named most of their ships after trees, like Mapleglen. CSL now uses those names.

In 2019, P&H purchased 10 grain elevators from Louis Dreyfus Company Canada ULC

Divisions
Other divisions of Parrish and Heimbecker include:  

- The P&H Milling Group focused on Flour Milling and Pea Proteins

- New Life Mills specializing in Animal Nutrition

References

External links
Parrish & Heimbecker Limited

Grain elevators in Canada
Companies based in Winnipeg
Food and drink companies established in 1909
Grain companies
1909 establishments in Manitoba
Family-owned companies of Canada